Lapworth Cirque is a cirque to the west of Goldschmidt Cirque in the eastern portion of the Read Mountains of the Shackleton Range, Antarctica. It was photographed from the air by the U.S. Navy in 1967, and surveyed by the British Antarctic Survey, 1968–71. In association with the names of geologists grouped in this area, it was named by the UK Antarctic Place-Names Committee in 1971 after British geologist Charles Lapworth, who established the stratigraphic succession in southern Scotland and who defined the Ordovician system; he was Professor of Geology and Physiography at Birmingham University, 1881–1913.

References

Cirques of Coats Land